Stegostenopos cryptogenes is a species of bluntnose knifefish endemic to Brazil where it is found in the Rio Negro basin. It is the only member of its genus according to FishBase, but studies have shown that it belongs in Hypopygus (making Stegostenopos a junior synonym) and this is followed by the Catalog of Fishes.

References

Hypopomidae
Fish described in 1997
Fish of South America
Fish of Brazil
Endemic fauna of Brazil